A shrug is a gesture that indicates either indifference or lack of knowledge.

"Shrug" can also refer to:

 Shoulder shrug, a weight training exercise
 Shrug (band), a band that later became Snow Patrol
 Shrug (clothing), an article of clothing
 "Shrug", a verb that means to cast off, as in the Ayn Rand novel Atlas Shrugged